Luther S. Olsen (born February 26, 1951) is an American politician and former member of the Wisconsin Legislature.  A Republican, he served 16 years in the Wisconsin State Senate (2005–2021) and ten years in the Wisconsin State Assembly (1994–2005). Olsen was one of several Wisconsin state senators to survive the 2011 Wisconsin Senate recall elections.

Early life, education, and early political career
Olsen was born on February 26, 1951, in Berlin, Wisconsin. In 1969, he graduated from Berlin High School. In 1973, he earned a B.S. from the University of Wisconsin–Madison. In 1976, he was elected to the Berlin School District Board, and was named President of the School Board in 1986. He left the board in 1997.

Wisconsin Legislature

Elections
Before 2011
In Luther's political career prior to 2011, he had never faced a Democratic party opponent. In 1994, he was elected to the Wisconsin State Assembly. He won re-election in 1996, 1998, 2000, and 2002. In 2004, he was elected the Wisconsin Senate and re-election 2008.

His current Senate district is much more conservative than the state as a whole. In the 2008 presidential election, Democrat Barack Obama narrowly won with 52%, while he won statewide with 57%. In the 2010 Wisconsin gubernatorial election, Republican Scott Walker won with 57%, while he won statewide with 53%. In the 2011 Wisconsin judicial election, Republican David Prosser won the district with 55%, while winning statewide with just 50%.

2011 recall election

Olsen was the target of an active recall effort as part of the 2011 Wisconsin protests. On March 2, 2011, the "Committee to Recall Olsen" officially registered with the Wisconsin Government Accountability Board. On April 18, 2011, organizers filed petitions containing roughly 24,000 signatures to recall Olsen. If more than 14,733 of those signatures are found valid, a recall election will ensue. On April 21, 2011, State Representative Fred Clark (D - Baraboo) announced his candidacy against Olsen in a possible recall election. In late May 2011, the Wisconsin Government Accountability Board verified petitions against Olsen, overruling his challenges. The recall election was held on August 9, 2011. Olsen emphasized his pro-education record during his 17-year political career. He defended the $1 billion cut to public education in the 2011 budget as necessary "cuts that needed to be done." Olsen defeated State Rep. Fred Clark with 52% of the vote.

Tenure
During the 2011 Wisconsin protests regarding Governor Walker's budget repair bill, Olsen described the bill as "pretty radical" and mentioned that he had reservations regarding voting for collective bargaining repeal. Olsen ultimately voted for the bill.

In 2011, One Wisconsin Now filed an ethics complaint against Olsen with the Government Accountability Board. The complaint alleged that Olsen inserted language into a bill in order to financially help his wife. Olsen's wife, Joan Wade, responded to the complaint by calling it 'ridiculous.'

Committee assignments
Olsen was chairman of the Education Committee. He was also a member of the Finance, Insurance and Housing, and Finance committees.

References

External links
Senator Luther S. Olsen at the Wisconsin State Legislature
constituency site
 
14th Senate District, Senator Olsen in the Wisconsin Blue Book (2005–2006)

Republican Party Wisconsin state senators
Republican Party members of the Wisconsin State Assembly
School board members in Wisconsin
1951 births
Living people
People from Berlin, Wisconsin
University of Wisconsin–Madison alumni
Businesspeople from Wisconsin
21st-century American politicians